Sherman Aaron Utsman Sr. (April 15, 1932 – June 10, 2019) was a NASCAR Grand National driver.

Biography 
Most of Utsman's rides were with the 1962 Ford Galaxie bearing the #6 number. Utsman was related to fellow drivers Dub Utsman, John Utsman, Larry Utsman, and Layman Utsman, who have all retired from driving in NASCAR competitions. Utsman's only top five finish came at the 1962 Confederate 200, which took place on August 3, 1962 at the Boyd Speedway in Chattanooga, Tennessee. Utsman was also a NASCAR owner/driver with him having legal ownership of a stock car in three different races. Utsman drove the race car twice and Joe Weatherly drove one of his vehicles at an untitled race at Speedway Park in Jacksonville, Florida on December 1, 1963.

Motorsports career results

NASCAR
(key) (Bold – Pole position awarded by qualifying time. Italics – Pole position earned by points standings or practice time. * – Most laps led. ** – All laps led.)

Grand National Series

References

External links

 Ultimate Racing History

1932 births
2019 deaths
NASCAR drivers
NASCAR team owners
People from Sullivan County, Tennessee
Racing drivers from Tennessee